Donald Douglas may refer to:

Donald Wills Douglas Sr. (1892–1981), founder of Douglas Aircraft Company
Donald Wills Douglas Jr. (1917–2004), son of the founder and later president of the company
Donald Douglas (Scottish actor) (born 1933), film and television actor
Donald Douglas (surgeon) (1911–1993), Scottish surgeon
Donald Douglas (politician), member of the Kentucky Senate
Don Douglas (1905–1945), Scottish-born actor in US films of the 1920s to 1940s
Don Douglas (footballer) (born 1934), Australian rules footballer

See also

Douglas (surname)